Aimee Brooks (born November 19, 1974) is an American former actress. She is mostly known for her roles in horror movies, including the lead protagonist in Critters 3. Her most recent film is Closed for the Season in 2010. Aimee Brooks also appeared in the television series Valerie, Blossom, Eerie, Indiana, Brooklyn Bridge, Criminal Minds, Shark and was a series regular in the sitcom Muddling Through.

Filmography

Film

Television

References

External links
 

1974 births
Living people
Actresses from California
American child actresses
American film actresses
American television actresses
20th-century American actresses
21st-century American actresses